The Bad Schandau Elevator is a passenger truss-tower elevator built in 1904 at Bad Schandau, a spa town in Saxony, Germany. It functions as an observation tower.

Overview
The elevator is driven by an electric motor, with the electricity generated by the Lichtenhain Waterfall. During the winter and emergencies, electricity was originally provided by a battery.

In 1921 the drive of the Bad Schandau Elevator were changed to three-phase alternating current, a crank handle was left for the emergency operation. During World War I, the facility was shut down. In 1950 a driving disk hoisting engine was introduced. In 1961 two additional anchoring wires were attached and in 1978 a new control. In the years 1989-1990 the plant, which was put under monument protection in 1954, was reconditioned.

The elevator is visible in some scenes of Wes Anderson's 2013 film The Grand Budapest Hotel.

External links

 Information and photographs (in German).
 
 Drawings of Bad Schandau Elevator

Individual elevators
Elbe Sandstone Mountains
Transport in Saxon Switzerland
elevator
Art Nouveau architecture in Germany
Buildings and structures completed in 1904
Observation towers in Saxony